The 1996 Michigan Democratic presidential primary was held on March 19, 1996, in Michigan as one of the Democratic Party's statewide nomination contests ahead of the 1996 presidential election. Incumbent President Bill Clinton did not appear on the ballot allowing  Uncommitted voters to win the primary.

Results

References 

Michigan
1996 Michigan elections
Michigan Democratic primaries